Bramson is a surname. Notable people with the surname include:

Leon Bramson (born 1869), Jewish activist, member of the first elected Russian Parliament in 1906–1907, then a leader and organizer of the World ORT
Maury Bramson (born 1951), American mathematician and statistician
Noam Bramson (born 1969), American politician from the state of New York
Phyllis Bramson, American painter
Steven Bramson, professional composer

See also
Bramson ORT College, nonprofit private two-year college in New York City
Bramson Home or Cranston-Geary House, a historic home listed on the National Register of Historic Places
Abramson
Brams